Sacred Lies is an American drama streaming television series based on the novel The Sacred Lies of Minnow Bly by Stephanie Oakes that premiered on July 27, 2018 on Facebook Watch. The series was created by Raelle Tucker and stars Elena Kampouris, Kevin Carroll, Kiana Madeira, Toby Huss, and Ryan Robbins. Its second season premiered on February 20, 2020 under the title Sacred Lies: The Singing Bones. On June 15, 2020, the first two seasons were acquired by Peacock.

Premise
Sacred Lies (Season 1) follows "a handless teen who escapes from a cult and finds herself in juvenile detention, suspected of knowing who killed her cult leader."

Cast and characters

Main
Elena Kampouris as Minnow Bly, a young teenage girl and former member of the Kevinian cult. She emerges from the woods of Lolo National Forest after 12 years, now missing both of her hands. She is sent to the Missoula Youth Correctional Facility after attacking a schizophrenic teenage boy. Zoë Noelle Baker portrays a young Minnow Bly in a recurring role.
Kevin Carroll as Dr. Alan Wilson, an FBI forensic psychologist that studies religious crimes, cults, and extremist groups. He has struggled from alcoholism and became estranged from his wife Carol following the death of their son Marcus. As he gets to know Minnow and her story, he attempts to separate his personal feelings of concern for her from his professional obligations as a member of the FBI.
Kiana Madeira as Angel Trujillo, an inmate at the Missoula Youth Correctional Facility and Minnow's roommate. She was incarcerated at the age of 12 and sentenced to serve 20 years. She was convicted of murdering her uncle with a shotgun after he sexually abused her.
Toby Huss as Kevin Groth a.k.a. The Prophet, the leader of the Kevinian cult, known to its followers as The Community, who is killed under mysterious circumstances. He claims to speak directly with God whom he knows by the name of "Charlie". He hails from Hamilton, Montana where, when he was 2 years old, his father died. Six months later, he was diagnosed with idiopathic pulmonary fibrosis though later claimed to be cured as proof of his power & faith in “Charlie”. Eric Vincent portrays a young Kevin Groth in a guest appearance in the episode "Chapter Four: God's Eyes".
Ryan Robbins as Samuel Bly, a construction worker and Minnow's father. Dissatisfied with his family's living situation and struggling with a gambling addiction, he eagerly joins the Kevinian cult. He is chosen as the Keeper of The Community upon their arrival in the woods wherein his responsibility is the safety and security of his fellow cult members. Following the death of his wife Olivia, he enters into a relationship with fellow Kevinian Vivienne

Patti Kim as Sheriff Yolanda Harjo, the sheriff of Missoula investigating the fire at the Kevinian cult's community and the death of Kevin Groth. She suspects Minnow's involvement and spends a great deal of effort attempting to obtain information from her.
Jennifer Tong as Tracey, a member of the Christian youth group at the correctional facility that constantly attempts to get Minnow to join. She was sentenced to serve time at the facility after attempting to use a Vespa to run over the girlfriend of a boy whom she loved. She subsequently began to date the boy who visits her at the facility.
Leah Gibson as Vivienne Schroeder, a former exotic dancer and member of the Kevinian cult. She and Samuel Bly begin a relationship following the death of his wife. She proves very loyal to The Prophet and is fairly abusive to Minnow and her sister.
Chanelle Peloso as Rose Matthews, a teenage girl from Pleasant Landing Trailer Park interested in comic books and resistant to becoming a member of the Kevinian cult. Her mother Dawn forces her into joining and she is later violently punished for breaking one of the community's rules. She is later revealed to have become one of The Prophet's many wives.
C. J. Jackman-Zigante as Benny, a counselor at the Missoula Youth Correctional Facility. While maintaining a gruff exterior, Benny frequently offers gestures of kindness to inmates including Minnow and Angel.
Zamani Wilder as Rashida, a member of the Christian youth group at the correctional facility. She was sentenced to the facility after being apprehended with a $1,200 alligator bag that her girlfriend had stolen and deciding to take the blame for its theft.
Hannah Jane Zirke as Constance Bly, Minnow's younger sister and a devout member of the Kevinian cult who wishes to marry The Prophet. She resents Minnow as she becomes the object of The Prophet's affections. She is killed while rushing in to The Prophet's hut after realizing that he was already dead.
Daniel Diemer as Cole, a member of the Kevinian cult who has a crush on Minnow. Angry at Minnow for spurning his advances, he informs the community of her relationship with Jude Leland after he saw them together.
Katrina Law as Stephanie Bailey, the English teacher at Missoula Youth Correctional Facility. She was raised in the foster care system and also coaches the correctional facility's basketball team. She and Dr. Wilson engage in a brief affair before she ends things after discovering he has been lying to Minnow.
Kathryn Kirkpatrick as Mrs. New, the Director of Facilities at Missoula Youth Correctional Facility where her job is to oversee the order and security of the center and monitor the health and well-being of all of the inmates.
Georgia Beaty as Krystal, an inmate at the correctional facility that harasses Minnow and is subsequently injured by Angel who was attempting to defend her. She later reveals that she is mentally ill and that she frequently acts out when her medications begin to wane.
Curtis Caravaggio as Trevor Pollankowsky, a military veteran and member of the Kevinian cult.
Sean Owen Roberts as Heath, a member of the Kevinian cult.
Shane Paul McGhie as Jude Leland, a teenage boy that lives in a cabin out in the woods of Lolo National Forest. He came to live there after his environmental activist father Wade Leland became a fugitive from the law due to suspected arson. He begins a relationship with Minnow, helps her burn down the Kevinians' community, and attempts to get her to return to the woods with him.
Anja Savcic as Olivia Bly, Minnow's mother and Samuel's wife who is hesitant to join the Kevinian cult. She is pregnant with her second child and concerned about giving birth outside of a hospital. She dies following the birth of her daughter Constance after suffering from blood loss.
Shelby Armstrong as Hairnet Girl, an inmate at the correctional facility that serves food in the mess hall. She later provides a makeshift birthday cake for Minnow's going away party.
Yael Yurman as Aviva, a Jewish inmate at the correctional facility and one of Minnow's friends.
Maya Kooner as Chandra, a Muslim inmate at the correctional facility and one of Minnow's friends.
Reese Alexander as Owen, the manager of Pleasant Landing Trailer Park and its only black resident. He doesn't join the Kevinian cult with the rest of his neighbors as he finds it clear that they do not want him due to his race.
April Telek as Dawn Matthews, a nurse and member of the Kevinian cult who forces her daughter Rose into joining as well. Being a nurse, she helps to deliver Olivia Bly's daughter Constance. She ends up feeling a great deal of guilt over Olivia's death during childbirth.
Myles McCarthy as Philip Lancaster, a young schizophrenic man off his medication that is attacked by Minnow and left with various injuries. He later attends Minnow's parole hearing where he offers her a gesture of forgiveness.
Olivia Steele Falconer as Nikki, an inmate at the correctional facility that bullies Minnow though who later seems to have become her friend.
Karen Holness as Carol Wilson, a lawyer and Dr. Wilson's now ex-wife. The couple became estranged following the suicide of their son Marcus. After finalizing their divorce, he lets her know that he will be alright and indicates that he is beginning to move on.

Guest
Wesley Salter as Scott Nussbaum ("Chapter One: The Handless Maiden"), a member of the extremist group Army of Mercy who is interviewed by Dr Wilson. He killed a doctor, and the man's wife, who had performed abortions
Ari Solomon as Charlie Dunlap ("Chapter Four: God's Eyes"), a janitor at Kevin Groth's high school for over 30 years that was fired after reports of inappropriate behavior with students. He reportedly died of cancer not long after his dismissal
Christina Jastrzembska as Mrs. Groth ("Chapter Four: God's Eyes"), Kevin Groth's widowed mother who holds her son in high esteem and believes that he was destined for a divine purpose.
Duncan Ollerenshaw as Carl Groth ("Chapter Four: God's Eyes"), Kevin Groth's brother who harbors feelings of resentment towards him due to the fact that he was left to care for their mother alone.
Isaach de Bankolé as Dr. Carter Elgin ("Chapter Eight: Wedding Day"), the owner of Elgin Advanced Robotics Laboratory who is developing new robotic prosthetics for amputees. He entered into his field after losing a leg in the Rwandan genocide. Dr. Wilson visits him to inquire about obtaining a pair of robotic hands for Minnow.
Eric Bempong as Marcus Wilson ("Chapter Ten: Subject - Minnow Bly"), Dr. Wilson's late son who committed suicide by driving his car off a bridge. Dr. Wilson continues to feel great remorse over his death and holds himself responsible for not doing more to prevent it.

Season 2 (2020)

Main

Juliette Lewis  as Harper 
Ryan Kwanten    as Peter/Hunter
Jordan Alexander    as Elsie/Maya
Kristin Bauer   as Shannon 
Kimiko Glenn    as Lily
Emily Alyn Lind
Siobhan Williams
Odiseas Georgiadis
Adrian Holmes
David Paetkau
Michael Kopsa

Episodes

Series overview

Season 1 (2018)

Season 2: The Singing Bones (2020)

Production

Background
Series creator Raelle Tucker has expressed how she was initially drawn into developing the series due to her own childhood experiences growing up in a cult. During the 1970s, Tucker and her family were members of the Rajneesh movement and years later these events would inspire her to want to work on a project involving the subject of cults.

Development
On January 16, 2018, it was announced that Facebook had given the production, a television series adaptation of Stephanie Oakes's novel The Sacred Lies of Minnow Bly, a series order for a first season consisting of ten episodes. The series was set to be written by Raelle Tucker who would also executive produce alongside Scott Winant, Jason Blum, Marci Wiseman, and Jeremy Gold. Tucker was also set to act as the series' showrunner while Winant would direct the first two episodes. Production companies involved in the series were slated to include Blumhouse Television, a subsidiary of independent film company Blumhouse Productions. On June 23, 2018, it was announced that the series would premiere on July 27, 2018. On December 13, 2018, it was announced that the series had been renewed for a second season which premiered on February 20, 2020 under the title Sacred Lies: The Singing Bones.

Series writer Molly Nussbaum has expressed the difficulty involved in the series' writing due to the time constraints imposed by Facebook. She explained how instead of viewing the limitation as an obstacle the staff saw it as a creative opportunity saying, "the 30-minute challenge really made us rigorous and smart."

Casting
On March 2, 2018, it was announced that Elena Kampouris, Kevin Carroll, Kiana Madeira, and Ryan Robbins had been cast in main roles. A month later, it was announced that Toby Huss had joined the main cast in a series regular role and that Katrina Law and Leah Gibson would appear in a recurring capacity.

Filming
Principal photography for season one began on March 15, 2018 in Vancouver, Canada and was set to last until May 25, 2018. Filming for the second season began on July 3, 2019 and ended on September 13, 2019.

Release

Marketing
On June 23, 2018, a teaser trailer for the series was released. On July 16, 2018, the full trailer for the series was released. From July 19 to July 22, 2018, during the 2018 San Diego Comic-Con, the series was promoted through an escape room experience outside of Petco Park.

Premiere
On June 24, 2018, the series held a screening at Seriesfest, an annual international television festival, at the Sie FilmCenter in Denver, Colorado. The screening was followed by a question-and-answer session with creator/executive producer Raelle Tucker, director/executive producer Scott Winant, Blumhouse co-president of television Jeremy Gold, and cast members including Kiana Madeira, Kevin Carroll, and Elena Kampouris. It was moderated by Facebook Watch's head of development, Mina Lefevre.

Reception
In a positive review, Varietys Caroline Framke offered the series praise saying, "With episodes running at an economical half-hour, Sacred Lies maintains a solid enough balance between withholding answers and laying groundwork for the mysteries ahead." In a similarly favorable critique, Pastes Alexis Gunderson lauded the series saying, "It is very artistic, not just in the color saturation, but in every shot of hands, fingers, and things that need hands and fingers to cross Minnow's line of sight in the detention center—shots that would feel fetishizing were it not for the absolute opacity of thought with which the shrewd Minnow, who is never presented as an object of pity, regards them. It is absolutely artistic. It is also grim. It is also an active, challenging watch. It is, as far as I can tell, all the things everyone's favorite dark prestige television is." In a more mixed assessment, The Globe and Mails John Doyle offered the series restrained approval saying, "Sacred Lies is a good, multilayered drama, although the vaguely supernatural quality to Minnow's past is milked a bit too hard." In an overall negative review, Indiewires Ben Travers gave the series a grade of "C−" and criticized it saying, "This half-hour drama is ineffective in teasing its larger mystery, and its dialogue can be laughably blunt. Die-hard fans of the book may stick around to see how it all plays out, but that would take a level of commitment usually seen...in cults!"

Other media

Aftershow
The Official Sacred Lies After Show is a companion aftershow series that airs live on the series' official Facebook page on Sunday evenings. The series is produced by AfterBuzz TV, hosted by Juliet Vibert, and features a panel of commentators and a featured guest from the show's cast or crew. Each episode runs between seventeen and fifty-three minutes in length.

Fatal Following
Fatal Following: The Truth About the Kevinian Cult is a companion true crime pseudo-documentary series released exclusively on the series' official Facebook page. The series is done in the style of modern true crime docuseries and every episode delves into the background of a different member of the Kevinian cult. Each episode runs between two and three minutes in length.

Juvie Stories
Juvie Stories is a companion series released exclusively on the series' official Facebook page. The series is done in the style of internet vlogs and features various inmates from the Missoula Youth Correctional Facility speaking directly to camera. Each episode runs between one and four minutes in length.

References

External links

2010s American teen drama television series
2018 American television series debuts
2020 American television series endings
English-language television shows
Facebook Watch original programming
Television series about teenagers